Sævar Jónsson (born 22 July 1958) is an Icelandic former footballer, who played as a defender.

Club career
Sævar started his career at Valur before moving abroad to play in Belgium. He returned to Iceland and played a year in Norway and Switzerland to finish his career again at Valur.

International career
Sævar made his debut for Iceland in 1980 and went on to collect 69 caps, scoring 1 goal. He played his last international match in an August 1992 friendly match against Israel, coming on as a substitute for Guðni Bergsson.

References

External links
 

1958 births
Living people
Saevar Jonsson
Saevar Jonsson
Saevar Jonsson
Saevar Jonsson
Cercle Brugge K.S.V. players
SK Brann players
FC Solothurn players
Saevar Jonsson
Eliteserien players
Expatriate footballers in Norway
Belgian Pro League players
Expatriate footballers in Belgium
Expatriate footballers in Switzerland
Saevar Jonsson
Saevar Jonsson
Saevar Jonsson
Association football defenders